P&H may refer to:

 P&H Mining, equipment manufacturer
 Palmer and Harvey, wholesaler
 Parrish & Heimbecker, grain company
 Pension & health, a contract stipulation for deductions for pension and health insurance